The 2007 Grand Rapids Rampage season was the 10th season for the franchise. They look to make the playoffs after finishing 2006 with a 5–11 record.  They went 4–12 record and missed the playoffs.

Schedule

Coaching
Sparky McEwen was coach of the Rampage during this season.

Stats

Offense

Passing

Rushing

Receiving

Touchdowns

Defense

Special teams

Kick return

Kicking

Grand Rapids Rampage
Grand Rapids Rampage seasons
2007 in sports in Michigan